Parvathi T., also known as Maala Parvathi, is an Indian actress, who appears in Malayalam, Hindi, Tamil, Telugu films.

Personal life

Parvathi was born in Thiruvananthapuram, to Adv C. V. Thrivikraman and gynaecologist Dr K. Lalitha. She completed her Pre-degree from All Saints College, Thiruvananthapuram and was the University Union Councilor. She completed her Bachelor's in Psychology from Government College for Women, Thiruvananthapuram. She was Vice Chairperson of College Union during the first year following which she became union chairperson in her college during her second year and also campus coordinator for SPIC MACAY. Parvathi has completed her Master's and M.Phil in Psychology from Kerala University's Kariavattom campus, Thiruvananthapuram. She pursued her LLB from Kerala Law Academy Law College, Thiruvananthapuram. Parvathi is married to B. Satheesan, who works with C-DIT, Government of Kerala. They have a son Ananthakrishnan, who has completed his graduation.

Career
She started her career in anchoring through 'Ulkazhcha' in Asianet and made her acting debut in 2007 through the Malayalam film Time directed by Shaji Kailas. Parvathi has 100 plus films to her credit. Some of her notable movies are Neelathamara, Leela, Kanyaka Talkies, Munnariyippu, Take Off, Comrade in America, Godha, Game Over, C U Soon and Maara. She has also associated with 'Abhinaya', a theatre group in Thiruvananthapuram. Parvati has worked with the director MG Jyothish for the plays The Lady from the Sea (Sagara Kanyaka), The Lesson and Bhagavadajjugam. She has authored a book titled Mayoorageethangal and penned lines for Sreeprasadam and Megamalhar musical albums composed by Damodar Narayanan. Parvathi is passionate about women's rights and has supported several survivors of GBV. Parvathi is working as a PR Consultant for MSL group since 2006 (clients include Hay Festival, Emirates Airlines etc.). She is also working for Ten Degree North Communications from 2016.

Theatre 
Theatrical performances include:
 Lady from the Sea (Sagarakanyaka) – 2009 – Directed by MG Jyothish
 Bhagavathajjugam – 2011 – Directed by MG Jyothish
 Lesson – 2011 – Directed by MG Jyothish
 Irakalodu Mathramalla Samsarikendathu – 2013– Directed by MG Jyothish & D Reghoothaman
 Various festivals, including World Theatre Festival 2012, OZ festival, Bhart Rang Mahothsav, Ibsen Festival

Filmography

As Actress

Malayalam films

Other language films

As a voice actor

Short films

Television

As host 
 Ulkazhcha – Asianet – 50 episodes – 1994 
 Suprabhatham ( First ever Morning Show) – Asianet – 1997 – 2000 – With Rajashree Warrier, B R Prasad & Sanal Pottie 
 Shubhadhinam (Morning Show) – Kairali TV– 2000–2003 – with Anoop menon and Ananthapadmanabhan 
 Ponpulari (Morning Show) – Surya TV– 2004 – 2005 
 Startalk (Celebrity chat)– Surya TV – 2005 – 2007
 Nishagandhi DD Malayalam
 Koottukkari DD Malayalam
 Special shows and interviews with celebrities and stars for Doordarshan, Indiavision, Asianet plus, Jaihind, ACV.

As panelist/judge 
 Veruthe Alla Bharya – Season I & III – Mazhavil Manorama
 Midukki – Season I – Mazhavil Manorama
 Made for each other – Season I – Mazhavil Manorama
 Comedy Stars - Asianet

Series 
 Anpirannol (Amrita TV)
 Ishtam (Surya TV)
 Sooryakaladi Mana (Amrita TV)
 Aniyathi (Mazhavil Manorama)
 Daivathinu Swantham Devootty (Mazhavil Manorama)

Commercial endorsements 

 Kalyan Jewellers
 Asian Paints Ltd
 Jos Alukkas
 Tanishq
 Make My Trip
 Linen Club
 Chemmannur Credits and Investments
 Jiomart

References

External links

Living people
1970 births
Indian psychologists
Indian women psychologists
21st-century Indian actresses
Indian film actresses
Actresses in Malayalam cinema
Actresses from Kerala
Actresses in Tamil cinema
Women writers from Kerala
Writers from Thiruvananthapuram
Television personalities from Kerala
Actresses in Malayalam television
Indian television actresses
Actresses in Telugu cinema